The Canon de 75 mle GPIII was a field gun used by Belgium during World War II. Cockerill mounted a sleeve in the barrels of ex-German 7.7 cm FK 16 guns received as reparations after World War I to convert them to the standard Belgian 75mm ammunition.  After 1940, the Wehrmacht designated captured guns as the 7.5 cm FK 236(b). This gun was nearly the equivalent of the German 7.5 cm FK 16 nA and apparently saw wider service than the other captured Belgian guns.

Notes

References
 Chamberlain, Peter & Gander, Terry. Light and Medium Field Artillery. New York: Arco, 1975
 Gander, Terry and Chamberlain, Peter. Weapons of the Third Reich: An Encyclopedic Survey of All Small Arms, Artillery and Special Weapons of the German Land Forces 1939-1945. New York: Doubleday, 1979 

World War II field artillery
World War II artillery of Belgium
75 mm artillery